Black Ninja may refer to:


People
Cocoa Samoa, (1945–2007), American Samoan professional wrestler who used the ring name "Black Ninja"
Kazuo Sakurada, (1948–2020), Japanese professional wrestler who used the ring name "Black Ninja"
Tori (wrestler), (born 1964), American bodybuilder and former wrestler under the name "Black Ninja"

Arts and entertainment
The Black Ninja, a 2003 American martial arts action film

Fictional characters
Snake Eyes (G.I. Joe), a fictional black ninja from the G.I. Joe franchise
Adam Park, a character in the Power Rangers franchise who had the power of the "Black Ninja Ranger"
Black Ninjas, a fictional ninja group from the video game Destroy All Humans! 2

See also
White Ninja (disambiguation)